Ascelin (or Anselm) was a medieval Bishop of Rochester.

Ascelin was prior of Dover Priory in Kent before being selected as bishop. He was consecrated in 1142. He died on 24 January 1148.

Citations

References
 British History Online Bishops of Rochester accessed on 30 October 2007
 

Bishops of Rochester
12th-century English Roman Catholic bishops
1148 deaths
Year of birth unknown